Home and Away is an Australian soap opera produced by the Seven Network since 1988. This list documents the current cast of actors and characters, recurring cast and characters, as well as new, returning and departing cast members. It is organised in order of the character's first on-screen appearance. If a character has been portrayed by different actors, the most recent portrayer is listed first.

Present characters

Regular characters

Recurring and guest characters

Former characters

References

External links
Cast and characters at the official AU website

Lists of Home and Away characters
H